

History of the Jews in Schleswig-Holstein prior to 1933 
Most of the German population of the Middle Ages were baptized Christians, and the Jewish minority suffered persecution and harassment for centuries. This began to change with the age of Enlightenment, when Jewish emancipation resulted in the consideration of Jewish rights from a cultural and historic perspective (and not just an economic one). In Prussia, under Frederick the Great, there was limited tolerance towards the so-called ‘Judenregal’ or the so-called Schutzjude, a "protected Jewish" status for German Jews granted by the imperial, princely, or royal courts. Jews were more inclined to adapt to the Christian environment through assimilation (e.g. through Christian baptism and change of name). During the Napoleonic Wars, the government transferred the principle of Jewish emancipation, which had been applied in France since 1791, to the occupied territories of Germany. For example, with the Prussian Jewish Edict of 1812, Jews living in Prussia became Prussian citizens, albeit with significant restrictions. The new constitutions of the North German Confederation (1867) introduced a strict separation of church and state and thus placed the Jews on an equal footing. The Constitution of the German Empire (1871-1918) intended – at least in legal terms – to make all German Jews equal citizens.

The Jews in Schleswig-Holstein were predominantly restricted to small towns until emancipation in 1871. There was also a slight improvement in the situation of the Jews in Schleswig-Holstein in the 19th century within the framework of Jewish emancipation by the Basic State Law for Schleswig-Holstein of September 15, 1848, which was only valid until 1851. After further legislation,this emancipation also applied in Lübeck (1848/52), Schleswig (1854) and Holstein (1863). It was considered formally complete with the founding of the German Reich in 1871.

However, legal equality of Jews found only limited approval among the Christian majority of the population and was only hesitantly implemented in everyday life. A growing number of people, especially in the bourgeoisie, held not only religiously motivated anti-Jewish views, but also racist, antisemitic stereotypes of Jews. Thousands of citizens organized themselves in antisemitic organizations, such as the Pan-German League - which was influential in the educated middle class and in politics - and later in the National Socialist German Workers' Party (NSDAP) to obstruct formal equal treatment of Jews, or to fight the non-Aryans. In short: "In everyday life, the members of the Jewish faith community were excluded, professionally massively disadvantaged and isolated in their social environment." This also had an effect on the willingness of Jews to emigrate. In Germany in 1925, 563,733 people, or 0.9% of the population, considered themselves as members of the Jewish religious community; the proportion fell to 499,682 (0.8%) under the influence of the Nazi persecution of Jews in the census of June 16, 1933. By 1939, the number of Jews in the German Reich had drastically decreased to 233,973 (0.34%).

This considerably expanded the group of persons officially registered as Jews because of their line of descent and no longer limited them to the Jewish creed. According to the German minority census of 17 May 1939, Jews had to state in detail on so-called ‘supplementary forms’ under threat of punishment whether their ancestors had one or two Jewish grandparents. Because of this, the Nazi state classified these people accordingly, e.g. as ‘full Jews’ (‘racial Jews’) or ‘half Jews’.

According to this racial delimitation, a total of 1,742 people of ‘Jewish descent’ lived in Schleswig-Holstein in 1939, of whom 755 were so-called ‘full Jews’, 473 ‘first-degree Jewish half-breeds’ and 514 ‘second-degree Jewish half-breeds’. Of the ‘full Jews’, 575 were regarded as ‘Jews of faith’, 136 as members of the regional Protestant or free churches, and 7 as Roman Catholic Christians. Under the increased pressure of persecution, many Jews emigrated. For example, 17,000 mostly male adult Polish Jews living in Germany were deported in trains from Germany to Poland on October 28 and 29, 1938 within the framework of the 1938 expulsion of Polish Jews from Germany. However, the mass deportation of Polish Jews from Schleswig-Holstein initially failed due to bureaucratic mishaps. But it was resumed in the spring of 1939 when they were threatened with being deported to concentration camps if they did not leave Germany themselves in a timely manner. Most of those affected fled to Poland, Netherlands, France and Belgium, where the German occupying power arrested them again after the start of World War II and deported them to extermination camps. The few Polish Jews who remained in the regional capital of Schleswig-Holstein, Kiel, were first deported by the Gestapo to a so-called ‘Jewish house’ (ghetto houses) in Leipzig and from there to a concentration camp.

In the big cities, the proportion of Jews was relatively higher than in the countryside. This was not only due to the comparatively higher attractiveness of city life, but also reflected the centuries-long official restriction of Jewish settlement. For example, Berlin had a Jewish share of 3.8%, Frankfurt 4.7%, Wrocław (Breslau) 3.2%, Cologne 2.0%, Hamburg 1.5%, Hanover 1.1% and Kiel 0.2%. In general, there was a north–south divide in the proportion of Jews in the total population of Germany with significant lower proportions of Jews living in Northern Germany. Moreover, 64% of the Jewish population in Schleswig-Holstein was concentrated in the two major cities, Lübeck and Kiel, while the remaining Jews were spread over 123 smaller towns and villages.

In 1933, about 1,900 Jews lived in Schleswig-Holstein, a relatively small number. They made up only 0.13% of the total population of Schleswig-Holstein or 0.34% of all Jews in the German ‘’Reich’’. Within a decade, the proportion continued to decline in the face of increasing persecution. In November 1942, only 59 Jews were still living in Schleswig-Holstein, spread over 18 towns. Over 1,600 had already been deported, most of them murdered. After the war, according to the census of 29 October 1946, there were again a total of 949 people of the Jewish faith in Schleswig-Holstein, 464 of them in displaced persons camps (DP camps).

Persecution of the Jews in the Nazi regime (1933–1945)

The perpetrators 
Apart from the major NS perpetrators responsible for the Holocaust in Schleswig-Holstein, who are listed in the following table, some of the persons listed below also took part in the mass extermination of Jews in the occupied territories (including the Jews deported there from the German Reich), e.g. in the Riga Ghetto, in the so-called Reichskommissariat Ostland and in the Minsk Ghetto in the Ukraine. The following (incomplete) table lists these NS perpetrator groups as examples.

The table only includes larger and exemplary smaller mass shootings. Abbreviations for Einsatzgruppen = EG, Einsatzkommando = EK, Lithuanian Activist Front = LAF, Organization of Ukrainian Nationalists = OUN, Police Battalion = PB, Special Command = SK, Security and Order Police = OP. (source: Wikipedia).

Individual perpetrators in Schleswig-Holstein (1933–1945) 
 , Head of the Jewish Department II B 5 of the Gestapo in Kiel (1941–1943); one of the main organizers of the deportations of Jews from Schleswig-Holstein (from 1941 to 1945).
 , 1931 local NS-group leader of Pinneberg, was appointed as the successor to Dr. Adolph Herting in Schleswig and rewarded with the office of mayor in Schleswig (1934-1936). In January 1936 he was appointed ‘Gauamtsleiter’ (Gau office leader) for local affairs. He made a significant contribution to the implementation of Nazi administrative principles in all local authorities of his jurisdiction in accordance with the municipal code revised in 1935.
 Heinz Behrens, born July 7, 1903, in Vegesack near Bremen. He joined the NSDAP in 1928 and received the golden party badge. In 1940, Behrens succeeded Albert Malzan as Nazi consultant  in Schleswig-Holstein. He resigned from office when he moved to Energieversorgung Ostland GmbH in occupied Riga in 1941. During the war he was first director of energy supply for the Baltic States and later for all conquered war economies in World War II in the occupied Soviet Eastern Territories. From March 1943 until the end of the war he was director of the energy management department at the Reichswerke Hermann Göring (Reichswerke AG for mining and metallurgical companiesHermann Göring) and worked in Berlin-Halensee. After imprisonment in 1945, as well as subsequent internment and denazification, he worked in cooperation with Dr. Gottfried Cremer in the BAK (Business Research Working Group on Ceramics). Both had already worked together in Reichswerke Hermann Göring state enterprises during the war.
 Hans Bernsau, district manager of the NSDAP in the district of Schleswig (1926–1931), from 1931 manager of the NSDAP district ‘North-East’ 
 Heinrich Blum, schools inspector, from 1925 district leader of the National Socialist Teachers' Association, provisional NSDAP mayor in Schleswig 1933 and a member of the 'old school' of the Nazi celebrities in Schleswig. Shortly after the Wehrmacht occupied the Baltic states, the notorious Gauleiter Hinrich Lohse commissioned him with the office of senior government and school councilor in the civil administration of the Reichskommissariat Ostland
 Peter Börnsen, served from January 1933 to 1945 as NSDAP district leader in Eckernförde and from 1939 to 1942 as deputy of the Schleswig district leader Dr. George Carstensen who was deployed in the war. He was elected to the Prussian state parliament in 1932 and was a member of the Reichstag from 1933 to 1945. After the end of the war he was interned for 37 months and sentenced to six years in prison in 1949. In the appeal proceedings, the sentence was reduced to three years.
 Paul Carell, (1911–1997), was a German diplomat and Nazi journalist. As a student of psychology at Kiel University, he headed the ‘combat committee against the un-German spirit’ at the university. These ‘combat committees’ agitated against ‘Jewish intellectualism’ as spearheads of the ‘Deutsche Studentenschaft’ (German student body). In the World War II Carell was chief press officer of the foreign minister Joachim von Ribbentrop and SS Obersturmbannführer. In May 1944, Schmidt gave advice on how to justify the deportation and murder of Hungarian Jews in order to avoid accusations of Mass murder. From 1965 to 1971, the public prosecutor of Verden investigated Paul Schmidt-Carell for murder. But the preliminary investigation, which was supposed to clarify his involvement in the murder of Hungarian Jews, was dropped without finding anything. As a result, Schmidt-Carell never had to answer to a court for his activities in the Nazi state.
 Georg Carstensen also belonged to the ‘old school’ of Nazi militants in Schleswig-Holstein. After 1945, the jury found that Carstensen must have been aware of all criminal acts due to his membership in the regional leadership corps of the NSDAP. He was accused of criminal acts - such as the execution of foreign workers in the Schleswig district, the arrests made in the city of Schleswig as a result of the 20 July plot 1944, or the transports of inmates of the sanatorium and nursing home in Meseritz and Bernburg. Also he was accused having been involved in an incident in Leck 1933, in which a local watchmaker was publicly chased through the streets with a sign around his neck and the inscription ‘I am the biggest rascal, I insulted the Reich Chancellor Adolf Hitler’ because of an alleged disparagement.
 Carl Coors, from 1937 NSDAP mayor in Friedrichstadt, the anti-Semitic measures were carried out here as part of the first nationwide boycott against Jewish business people on 1 April 1937.
 Georg Dahm, citizen of Kiel Criminal defense lawyer and International lawyer. Along with Friedrich Schaffstein, he was one of the most exposed representatives of Nazi criminal law theory. From 1935 to 1937 he was a pioneer of the persecution of the Jews at Kiel University.
 Thomas Frahm, NSDAP local group leader in Schuby, where he is said to have exercised a ‘regime of terror’.
 Gustav Frenssen, (* October 19 1863 in Barlt, Dithmarschen; † April 11 1945 ibid); German writer of the Nazi movement and of the ‘’Völkisch movement’’. From 1932 onwards he was pioneer of the Nazi state ideology by publicly taking sides against ‘Jews and Jewish artists’ before and during the Nazi period. Frenssen was largely to blame for the crimes against the Jews during the Nazi regime.
 Otto Gestefeld, district deputy, deputy district administrator of Schleswig and member of the ‘old combatants’ of NSDAP members in the district of Schleswig.
 Hans Gewecke, NSDAP district leader in the Duchy of Saxe-Lauenburg. In 1941 and 1945 he worked as a district commissioner in the Lithuanian city of Schaulen (1941–1945)
 Emil Gosch, NSDAP local group leader in Silberstedt.
 Carl Wilhelm Hahn (journalist), journalist and editor, historian, archivist and head of the ‘Landessippenamt’ (state tribe office) Schleswig-Holstein in the Nazi regime
 Claus-Peter Hans, was initially NSDAP local group leader in Seeth / Drage, Nordfriesland and from July 1932 to May 1945 district leader in the district of Flensburg county. From October 1935 to November 1937 he was in personal union district administrator and district deputy, and between 1933 and 1935 as well 1941 and 1945 he was deputy district administrator.
 Ernst Hansen (‚Kreisbauernführer’, district farmer leader). Together with other regional NSDAP leading figures he and others mistreated and abused a worker, forcing him to carry a placard with the inscription ‘I am a usurer and cutthroat’ hung around his neck, chasing him through the city of Schleswig.
 Erich Hasse, belonged to the hard core of the regional NSDAP. He was plant manager of the district shipping line. His fellow part members, G. Knutzen and H. Reincke, both active in Schleswig's Sturmabteilung (SA )and Schutzstaffel (SS) storms since 1930 and 1931 respectively, were employed with him to accommodate the "Old combatants".
 Ferdinand Jans, 1933, ‘Kreisbetriebsgemeinschaftsleiter’ (district company leader) in the ‘Deutschen Arbeiterverband’ (German workers' association) of the construction industry in the district of Schleswig. He then became district administrator of the German Labour Front (DAF). As such he was appointed by the mayor of Baselli on 27 November 1935 as an honorary deputy in the city of Schleswig.
 Jürgen JönsErfde was one of the early Nazi agitators in Schleswig and was a member of the district council as second district deputy until his death.
 Ernst Kolbe, belonged to the type of battle-hardened warhorse who did not shy away from any use of force. Kolbe's unscrupulousness became particularly clear in the ‘protective custody measures’ of politically dissidents, staged in the course of the Nazi ‘takeover’, and in further persecution actions, e.g. in the municipality of Börm near Schleswig. He was also a member of the SS and went to Copenhagen as a Hauptscharführer when Denmark was occupied, where he worked as a Gestapo employee. He died in the course of an action by Danish resistance fighters, during the so-called storming of the "Shellhuset", the Gestapo headquarters in Copenhagen, on 21 March 1945.
 Hans Kolbe, naval officer, retired Vice Admiral, fought in the civil war-like conflicts in the wake of the Kapp Putsch on 13 March 1920 in a leading position against armed revolutionary workers squads in the Ruhr area. In October 1936 he became Gauamtsleiter of the Reichskolonialbund. In 1941 he was appointed 'honorary' Standartenfuhrer of the Security Service of the SS. For the public and unlawful executions of Polish foreign workers in Sieverstedt near Flensburg and Dollrottfeld in 1941, he had transported by truck more than 100 prisoners of war from the Schleswig district. Kolbe was also aware of an arbitrary execution of Polish foreign workers by the Gestapo near Kropp in November 1941.
 Hinrich Lohse, Gauleiter of Schleswig-Holstein, an notorious war criminal, best known for his rule of the Reichskommissariat Ostland, during World War II
 Albert Malzahn (born 1899), 1934–1943, district economic advisor in SH; managing director, Elmshorn; President of the IHK Kiel; Chairman of the Landesbank of the Province of Schleswig-Holstein.
 Joachim Meyer-Quade, a German Nazi Party (NSDAP) official and Sturmabteilung (SA) Obergruppenführer. He briefly served as the Gauleiter of Gau Schleswig-Holstein. Co-founder of the SA in Schleswig. Through his work for the party in the district of Schleswig, he managed the career leap that would lead him to high offices within the Nazi hierarchy: 1932 District leadership for the NSDAP "North-East District", with the areas of Flensburg, Schleswig and Eckernförde. In this capacity, he took part in the storm on July 10, 1932, arranged by SA men of ‘Sturm IV/86’, on the Eckernförde union building, during which two social-democratic farm workers were stabbed to death. Elected to the district council on May 12, 1933, he was appointed district administrator of the Schleswig district. Promoted to brigade leader of the SA group ‘Nordmark’ on 1 February 1934, Gauleiter Hinrich Lohse appointed him chief of police of Kiel in October 1934. In the same year he also became an assessor in the People's Court (Germany) a Sondergericht ("special court") of Nazi Germany in Berlin. In 1938 he was appointed SA Obergruppenfuhrer in the Nordmark. As such, he issued the order to plunder and destroy the synagogues in Schleswig-Holstein and to arrest the Jewish population on the pogrom night of Kristallnacht. When war broke out, he left Schleswig-Holstein, volunteered for military service and was killed as a lieutenant in the 6th Infantry Regiment on 10 September 1939 at Piątek. His grave became a ‘place of pilgrimage’ for his fellow combatants in Schleswig.
 Hinrich Möller,  SS-Brigadeführer and Generalmajor of Police. In the Reichspogromnacht Möller was one of the main actors in the crimes committed against ‘Jews’ in Schleswig-Holstein.
 Ernst Paulsen, Dr., NSDAP local group leaders from the very beginning in Schleswig, from 1 March 1925
 Max Plaut (born 1901), lawyer, economist and Jewish association official. From 1939 head of the Northwest Germany district office of the Reich Association of Jews in Germany. In this function he was also responsible for the concerns of the Jews in Schleswig-Holstein and Lower Saxony.
 Ernst Ramcke, from 1928 member of the SA, in which he, promoted to Obersturmführer, led the ‘Schleswiger Sturm 23/86’. Ramcke also acted as district speaker for the party and district professional administrator of the German Labour Front (DAF) and, honoured with the golden party badge, belonged to the Nazi ‘old combatants’. Incidentally, together with Bruno Steen, he belonged to the circle of informers who, from May 1933, had been systematically involved in the dismissals for political reasons in the city administration.
 Ernst Graf zu Reventlow, (1869–1943). ) He ran unsuccessfully for the Reichstag in 1907 and 1912 for the anti-Semitic German Social Reform Party in the Flensburg- Apenrade constituency. After 1918 he became involved in right-wing extremist groups before joining the NSDAP in 1927, which he represented in the Reichstag until his death.
 Hermann Riecken, NSDAP member from the very beginning, mayor of Heikendorf (1933–1939), from 1939 district chairman of the city of Flensburg, and from 1941 Nazi regional commissioner in the Estonian district Pärnu County (German, Pärnau) and in Latvian Daugavpils (Dünaburg, in German) (1942–1944) involved in Nazi atrocities.
 Roland Siegel, Dr., 1933, he became provisional district administrator in Schleswig. In December 1932 worked as a senior administrative officer in the political department of the Berlin police chief, and after 30 January 1933 as head of personnel in a key position. He was a close associate of the Nazi police chief, the retired Rear Admiral von Levetzow, and played a key role in the political cleansing of the civil service. At the beginning of May 1933 he was promoted to the Prussian Ministry of the Interior. On 1 October 1933 he was appointed as senior civil servant.
 Kurt Stawizki, from 1919, Freikorps in Stein, Schleswig-Holstein (near Kiel); from 1933, Gestapo, Hamburg. From mid-October 1940 Commander of the Security Police and SD-Commander (KdS) in Kraków (Poland). From July 1941 head of the Gestapo in Lemberg (Ukraine), involved in the Massacre of Lwów professors.
 Bruno Steen, Ortsgruppenleiter in Schleswig, notorious for his actions against the Jewish brothers Max and Bernhard Weinberg in Schleswig, whom he publicly insulted as 'Jewish rascals'. The Weinberg family lost their German citizenship in Schleswig on 3 April 1934, but received it back after a successful appeal on 17 September 1935 without any justification. Max Bernhard and Bernhard Weinberg survived the war as ‘half Jews’.
 Erich Straub, Dr. med., first NSDAP city councilor in Schleswig. In 1930 he became head of the district department for public health and racial welfare of the NSDAP. In November 1933 he was promoted to provincial councillor, entrusted with the management of welfare education. Between February 1941 and March 1943 he also worked as an expert for the Nazi T-4 Euthanasia program. He belonged to the NSDAP clique of the 'Old combatants' in Schleswig.
 Jürgen Tams, farmer in Groß Rheide. From April 1929 NSDAP local group leader, from 1 February 1931 he was storm leader of an SA storm initially comprising 30 members, which had grown to over 300 members by the end of 1932. In 1930 he took over the post of district agricultural adviser for the Nazi party.
 Albert Zerrahn, Master fisherman and innkeeper, local NSDAP group Tolk since 1925 and member of the "Old Combatants". Carl Zerrahn's "Waldlust" was considered the "nucleus of the movement" in the Schleswig district. In 1933, despite public protests, he also became head of the Nübel office. Albert and his son Wilhelm Zerrahn were close friends with Hinrich Lohse.
 Wilhelm Zerrahn, joined the Schutzstaffel (SS) in 1931, where he purposefully pursued a career. In 1934 he first became SS-Oberscharführer in Flensburg. Until 1937 he served as Schutzstaffel (SS) Brigadefuhrer in the 50th SS Staff Department and from November 1937 on the SS Staff. In December 1940 he was appointed SS group leader. Promoted to Sicherheitsdienst (SD) group leader in April 1941, a short time later he was promoted to senior group leader in the Reich Security Main Office

Perpetrators who worked in Schleswig-Holstein after 1945 
 Hans-Adolf Asbach, NSDAP district captain of the Ukrainian Auxiliary Police in occupied Poland and in Galicia. - Minister of Social Affairs of Schleswig-Holstein (1950–1957)
 Paul Carell, see above, continued to work after 1945. As late as the 1970s, for example, he wrote political columns under the pseudonym Vocator in the Norddeutsche Rundschau, Itzehoe, under chief editor Heinz Longerich, the father of Peter Longerich one of the leading German authorities on the Holocaust. and in the German weekly news magazine Der Spiegel. There, in an article on 16 January 1957, he launched the thesis that Marinus van der Lubbe was the sole perpetrator who exonerated the Nazis in the Reichstag fire of 1933.
 Hartmut Gerstenhauer, 1939–1945: District administrator in German Occupation of Poland (1939–1945). Involved in the organization of the Holocaust in the Lublin district as district captain and senior official of the district administration. - From 1954, judge at the State Social Court Schleswig-Holstein; from 1962, President of the Senate at the Schleswig-Holstein State Social Court in Schleswig.
 Werner Heyde, (1902-1964) was a German psychiatrist. He was one of the main organizers of Nazi Germany's T-4 Euthanasia Program. see The Heyde-Sawade Affair
 Hartmann Lauterbacher, originated from Salem, Schleswig-Holstein; from 1927, Chief of Staff and deputy Reich youth leader of the Hitler Youth, NSDAP, Gauleiter of the Gau ‘South Hanover-Brunswick’, Oberpräsident of the Province of Hanover and SS-Obergruppenführer. - From 1950 he worked for the Gehlen Organization the intelligence agency established in June 1946 and later until 1963 for the Federal Intelligence Service
 Hans-Werner Otto (State Secretary), "occupation specialist", according to Braunbuch of the GDR; from April 1942, regional commissioner in Nikolayev, Reichskommissariat Ukraine. - 1950–1964, State Secretary in the Ministry of Social Affairs, Kiel, under Minister Hans-Adolf Asbach; 1967–1971, 1971 he was Secretary of State in the Schleswig-Holstein Ministry of the Interior.

Informers 
Persecuted Jews often only came into the sights of the Gestapo through denunciation. In the family context, men were by far the most frequent victims of denunciation. They were denounced most frequently by women, not least from their own families. In the area of the special court in Kiel, 12% of all complaints came from the family. 92% of them were reimbursed by women. Most of these so-called 'Judas women' were not held accountable after the war, but continued to live unmolested.

The Victims 
For a list of names of persecuted Jews in Schleswig-Holstein in the period 1933–1945 see the entry in the German wiki: Gedenkbuch – Opfer der Verfolgung der Juden unter der nationalsozialistischen Gewaltherrschaft 1933–1945 (Memorial Book - Victims of the persecution of the Jews under the National Socialist tyranny 1933–1945).

Individual Fates of Persecuted Jews in Schleswig-Holstein 
 Heinz Salomon, SPD politician. He was taken to the Theresienstadt concentration camp in the last transport with Jews from Schleswig-Holstein on 14 February 1945 and returned to the city of Kiel seriously ill as the first Jew after the World War II.
 Nathan Israel Cohn, (1862-1942) and his family. Cohn worked as a painter in Heikendorf: His wife Hanna Cohn (born Lunczer) died 'of old age' in the mental hospital of Neustadt in Holstein in April 1941, and her sister, Sarah Hedwig Lunczer, committed suicide on 17 June 1942 after she had  received her deportation order. According to the official version, N.I. Cohn himself died after his imprisonment on 13 March 1942 from "bladder cancer and constriction of the bladder".
 Fro trade unionists and KPD members in Schleswig-Holstein, see 
 For Jehovah's Witnesses in Schleswig-Holstein see

Places of Remembrance

Synagogues in Schleswig-Holstein 
During the November pogrom of 1938 in the night from 9 to 10 November 1938 - also cynically called the Night of Broken Glass - violent measures against Jews in Germany were organized and controlled by the Nazi Germany and over 1,400 Synagogues, prayer rooms and other meeting rooms as well as thousands of shops, apartments and Jewish cemeteries destroyed, at least four of them in Schleswig-Holstein. The Pogroms mark the transition from discrimination against German Jews since 1933 to systematic persecution, which culminated in the Holocaust almost three years later.

A list of synagogues destroyed in Nazi Germany from 1933 to 1945, is to be found in the German Wikipedia: Liste der im Deutschen Reich von 1933 bis 1945 zerstörten Synagogen
 Synagoge (Ahrensburg), destroyed in the November pogrom of 1938
 Synagoge Elmshorn, destroyed in the November pogrom of 1938
 Synagoge Goethestraße Kiel, destroyed in the November pogrom of 1938
 Synagoge (Lübeck), the interior was destroyed during the November pogrom of 1938
 Synagoge (Rendsburg), the interior was destroyed during the November pogrom of 1938.

Jewish cemeteries in Schleswig Holstein 
The desecration of Jewish cemeteries with politically motivated slogans like ‘Jews out’, ‘Judensau’, ‘Heil Hitler’, ‘we'll fill up the 7 million  (murdered jews)’ or with SS runes and Swastika took place en masse in Germany during the time of Nazi Germany. According to estimates by the historian Julius H. Schoeps, 80 to 90 percent of the approximately 1,700 Jewish resting places in the German Reich were desecrated during this period. Statistical information on how many cemeteries were affected in Schleswig-Holstein is not available (see individual reports on the history of the cemeteries below).
Jewish cemeteries were desecrated in various ways, first through direct damage, which had been frequent since 1938. From 1942, however, also through actions as part of the Reichsmetallspende, which offered a pretext for removing bars and other metal objects from Jewish cemeteries. SA men and Hitler Youth took the opportunity to smash stone graves. The ‘Reichsinstitut für Geschichte des neuen Deutschlands’ had the deceased exhumed in order to carry out ‘skull and other bone measurements’. By desecrating the cemeteries, the perpetrators want to destroy the religiously based durability of the burial sites and the memory of Jewish life. The Nazis wanted to erase its symbolic presence and violate both the dignity of the deceased and that of their relatives. For believing Jews, grave desecration is particularly serious because the grave is in a Jewish cemetery (‘burial house’ or ‘house of eternity’) intended for eternity. This corresponds to one of the most fundamental tenets of Jewish Halakha. The burial is mandatory and permanent peace of the dead is considered mandatory. Unlike in Christianity, a tomb may not be reoccupied. An exhumation or relocation of a grave is - apart from very special circumstances - not permitted. A disturbance of the peace of the dead causes a deep psychological dismay in the Jewish community and in some cases increases a ‘persistent mourning disorder’ among relatives. A tombstone symbolizes the obligation not to forget the deceased. With the resurgence of anti-Semitism in Germany, over 2,000 Jewish cemeteries have again been desecrated since the end of the war. "The destruction of Jewish cemeteries is not an expression of Antisemitism, it is itself Antisemitism" Theodor W. Adorno commented on the increasing desecration of Jewish cemeteries back in the 1950s.

List of Jewish cemeteries in Schleswig-Holstein
(The following entries are only available in the German Wikipedia)
 Jewish Cemetery (Lübeck-Moisling)
 Jewish Cemetery (Lübeck, Schönböckener Straße)
 Old Jewish Cemetery (Kiel)
 Jewish Cemetery (Eutin)
 Jewish Cemetery Glückstadt
 Old Jewish Cemetery (Bad Segeberg)
 Old Jewish Cemetery (Friedrichstadt)
 Jewish Cemetery (Ahrensburg)
 Jewish Cemetery (Stockelsdorf)
 Jewish Cemetery Elmshorn
 Jewish Cemetery Westerrönfeld
 Jewish Cemetery (Neustadt in Holstein)
 Jewish Museum Rendsburg
 Jewish Children's Home Föhr

Jew house in Schleswig-Holstein
The Judenhaus, i.e. 'Jews' House' were larger residential buildings from (formerly) Jewish property which the Nazi state converted from 1939 into ghetto houses. Here the Gestapo forcibly quartered the people who had been declared "of Jewish descent" - according to the Nuremberg Race Laws of 1935. The buildings were clearly marked on the outside as so-called "Jews' House" and were subject to Gestapo surveillance. In Kiel, the Jews were concentrated in the "Gängeviertel" where two "Jews' Houses"  existed: at ‘Kleiner Kuhberg 25, on the corner of Feuergang 2’, and at ‘Flämische Straße 22a’. On 6 December 1941, the first 977 Jews from the Hamburg, Lüneburg and the Schleswig-Holstein area were deported in a collective transport to the Jungfernhof concentration camp near Riga, including more than 40 from Kiel and environment and 86 Jews from Lübeck. A second collective transport with a total of 801 Jews from the same region led directly to KZ Theresienstadt on 19 July 1942. The last 'Jewish-born' residents of these houses in Schleswig-Holstein were deported in mid-1943. Most of the deportees who survived the Riga Ghetto and Minsk Ghetto later died in other extermination camps (see also in the German Wikipedia: Judenhäuser in der Stadt Braunschweig (Jewish houses in the city of Braunschweig). A total of around 240 Jews from Kiel became victims of Nazi persecution.

Example of a 'Jews’house' for Kiel and the surrounding area: ‘Kleiner Kuhberg 25, Feuergang 2’ 
Kiel: The persecution and deportation of the Schleswig-Holstein Jews reflected in the history of two houses.

Nazi concentration camps subcamps in Schleswig-Holstein area

The following is a list of Nazi concentration camps subcamps in the area:
 Kaltenkirchen concentration camp, satellite camp of Neuengamme concentration camp
 KZ satellite camp Kiel, temporary satellite camp of the Neuengamme concentration camp
 Husum-Schwesing concentration camp, in the Engelsburg district of Schwesingen, north-east of Husum; Neuengamme concentration camp subcamp
 KZ Ahrensbök, 1933–34, an early (‘wild’) concentration camp for Nazi opponents - mostly communists, social democrats, trade unionists
 KZ Kuhlen, early ("wild") camp, in Kuhlen near Rickling, Germany in Schleswig-Holstein, 18 July 1933 to 7 October 27, 1933. Most of the prisoners were communists and social democrats.
 KZ Eutin, an early ("wild") concentration camp in Eutin, July 1933 to May 1934, mainly for communists, social democrats, trade unionists and others unpopular with the Nazi regime.
 concentration camp Ladelund, located Ladelund in November 1944 about 20 km northeast of Niebüll on the German-Danish border, as a satellite camp of the Neuengamme concentration camp in connection with the construction of the so-called ‘Frisian Wall’ (Friesenwall).
 Neustadt in Holstein Concentration Camp External Command, external work assignments in Neustadt in Holstein of the Neuengamme concentration camp; 15 concentration camp prisoners who were used for construction work in Neustadt from December 1944 to May 1, 1945.
 KZ-Fürstengrube-Death March, also referred to as Death March from Auschwitz to Holstein, was a death march by Concentration Camp prisoners as part of the evacuation of the concentration camp Fürstengrube subcamp in Upper Silesia (see a list of subcamps of Auschwitz concentration camp subcamps. The lack of nutrition, illness, exhaustion, abuse and murder claimed numerous victims on this death march from January to May 1945 with several intermediate stations.

Literature 
 Klaus-Dieter Alicke: From the history of the Jewish communities in the German-speaking area: Flensburg (Schleswig-Holstein) . Winsen (Aller) 2020
 Stefanie Endlich, Beate Rossié: NS perpetrators and war criminals under the protection of the church, new beginnings after 1945? (Episode 3), Evangelical-Lutheran Church in Northern Germany (Nordkirche), Hamburg 2019
 Society for Schleswig-Holstein History: Christians and Jews 1933-1945: The Evangelical-Lutheran Church (in North Elbia) under National Socialism . Society for Schleswig-Holstein History, Kiel 2020
 Bettina Goldberg: Jews in Schleswig-Holstein - A historical overview. In: Hering, Rainer (ed.): The "Night of Crystals" in Schleswig-Holstein. The November pogrom in historical context. Hamburg: Publications of the Schleswig-Holstein State Archives, Volume 109, p. 29 - 51.
 Klaus Klinger: "Ignorance instead of justice - the Schleswig-Holstein post-war justice system and the persecution of the Jews." In: Gerhard Paul, Gillis Carlebach (eds.): Menorah and swastika: On the history of the Jews in and from Schleswig-Holstein, Lübeck and Altona: 1918-1998. Wachholtz, Neumünster 1998, ISBN 3-529-06149-2, pp. 723–728
 Sebastian Lehmann: "District leader of the NSDAP in Schleswig-Holstein: Curriculum vitae and ruling practice of a regional power elite." Publishing house for regional history, Bielefeld 2007, IZRG publication series, volume 13, ISBN 3-89534-653-5
 Sebastian Lehmann: Documented for the first time: Curriculum vitae of the district leaders in the north - interview with Sebastian Lehmann about his pioneering work on Nazi research in Schleswig-Holstein. Flensburger Tageblatt, July 5, 2007
 Gerhard Paul, Gillis Carlebach (eds.): "Menorah and swastika: On the history of the Jews in and from Schleswig-Holstein, Lübeck and Altona: 1918-1998." Wachholtz, Neumünster 1998, ISBN 3-529-06149- 2
 Gerhard Paul: "The Jewish residents depend only on themselves." Jews in Schleswig-Holstein before and after 1933. In: Jewish life and persecution of Jews in Friesland. Bredstedt 2001, p. 77 –98.
 Gerhard Paul: "What will become of us remains a mystery". Exhibition in the former Rendsburg synagogue on the history of the emigration, expulsion and flight of Jews from Schleswig-Holstein (1933-1941). In: Information on contemporary Schleswig-Holstein history. Volume 38, 2000, p. 106– 111
 State Center for Political Education:  To commemorate - 12/6/2011 - 70th anniversary of the deportation of Jews from Schleswig-Holstein. Background. Publication series of the State Center for Political Education Schleswig-Holstein, Kiel 2011.

Individual proofs 

History of Schleswig-Holstein
Jewish German history
The Holocaust in Germany
 
Holocaust studies